Vorley Spencer Ellis (known as Spencer; 1882 – 2 August 1977) was a Welsh Anglican priest in the mid 20th century.

Ellis was born into an ecclesiastical family and educated at Ruthin School and St Catherine's College, Oxford. Ordained in 1908, he began his career with a curacy at Chesterfield Parish Church. From 1912 to 1938 he held three incumbencies in Liverpool.  In 1938 he was appointed Dean of St Asaph, a position he held for 19 years.

References

1882 births
1977 deaths
People educated at Ruthin School
Alumni of St Catherine's College, Oxford
Welsh Anglicans
Deans of St Asaph